Lolesia Jeremiah Maselle Bukwimba (born 24 February 1971) is a Tanzanian CCM politician and Member of Parliament for Busanda constituency since 2010.

References

1971 births
Living people
Chama Cha Mapinduzi MPs
Tanzanian MPs 2010–2015
Bwiru Secondary School alumni
Rugambwa Secondary School alumni
Sokoine University of Agriculture alumni
Southern New Hampshire University alumni